The southern scrub robin (Drymodes brunneopygia) is a species of bird in the family Petroicidae.
It is endemic to Australia, where it occurs in mallee and heathland in the semi-arid southern parts of the continent, extending from Wyperfeld National Park in Victoria in the east through South Australia to the west coast between Kalbarri and the Pinnacles in Nambung National Park.

Most of the plumage is grey, except for a dullish red tail and patterned black-and-white wings. The legs are unusually long for a passerine, and are frequently used to hop through the dense heathland that forms the bird's habitat, where it searches for insects and other small invertebrates.

Unusually for a passerine, the southern scrub robin lays only a single egg, which is grey-green in colour for camouflage amongst the sclerophyllous flora that forms its habitat. Each year between July and December, an egg is laid in a nest of twigs on the ground, and which subsequently hatches after sixteen days.

References

southern scrub robin
Birds of Western Australia
Birds of South Australia
Birds of New South Wales
Endemic birds of Australia
southern scrub robin
Taxonomy articles created by Polbot